Chesham may refer to:

Places 
Canada
Chesham River, a tributary of rivière au Saumon in Estrie, Quebec, Canada

England

Chesham, Buckinghamshire
Chesham Bois, Buckinghamshire
Chesham Urban District, a former local government district in Buckinghamshire

Iran
Chesham, Iran

United States
Chesham, New Hampshire

Companies
Chesham Amalgamations, a mergers and acquisitions broker based in London